Ibrahim Chaftar Bey (1902–1988) was an Egyptian philatelist who signed the Roll of Distinguished Philatelists in 1950.

Works 
In October 1973, Chaftar's "Finds in Early Egyptian Postmarks" was published in the Journal of The Philatelic Society of Egypt.

References

Egyptian philatelists
1902 births
1988 deaths
Signatories to the Roll of Distinguished Philatelists